Cupriavidus plantarum  is a bacterium from the genus of Cupriavidus which has been isolated from the rhizospheres of the plants agave, maize and sorghum.

References

 

Burkholderiaceae
Bacteria described in 2015